Viktor Wynd is an artist, author, lecturer, impresario and committee member of The London Institute of 'Pataphysics.

Artwork
As an artist, Wynd created The Viktor Wynd Museum of Curiosities, Fine Art & Natural History in London's East End, a strange reinterpretation of a Renaissance wunderkabinet, stuffed with two headed lambs, Fiji mermaids, unicorns, taxidermy, dodo bones, erotica, old master etchings, surrealist, occult & outsider artworks and celebrity faeces. The museum has featured in a BBC4 documentary on Cabinets of Curiosity and is ranked position 28 out of 1237 speciality museums in London on trip advisor

In 2005 he had an exhibition entitled 'Structures of The Sublime; Towards a Greater Understanding of Chaos' at Ingalls & Associates in Miami, featuring drawings and video.

In 2007 he had another exhibition in Miami, called in reference to Goethe, 'The Sorrows of Young Wynd', based around a waxwork figure of himself hanging by a noose from the middle of the gallery, surrounded by a cloud of tropical butterflies and many other images of him committing suicide.

As an impresario, he founded The Last Tuesday Society with David Piper in 2003. He went on to put up Halloween parties in London for many thousands of guests, often with literary themes
and other over the top parties such as his masked balls
The Animal Party at The Old Vic tunnels where people were told to 'Dress Like a Beast Dance Like a Beast' and a festival Wyndstock held at Houghton Hall in Norfolk
He also runs what may be London's longest running literary salon with over 500 events in the last ten years.

Other work
Wynd is the author of two books, Structures of The Sublime; Towards a Greater Understanding of Chaos, a fragmentary, modernist anti-novel published in 2005 in Miami and Viktor Wynd's Cabinet of Wonders published by Prestel/Random House in 2014 described by the filmmaker John Waters as being 'An insanely delightful how-to guide on becoming a mentally ill, cheerily obsessive eccentric hoarder told with lunatic humor and absolute joy. Viktor Wynd is a sick orchid who seems like the perfect man to me'.

He wrote an essay about his friend Sebastian Horsley for Yale University Press's book Artist / Rebel Dandy

He has made several TV appearances on documentaries and programs, and National Geographic included him in their "Taboo" documentary series.

As a lecturer he talks about cabinets of curiosities, his book and his museum at The Lost Lectures, the British Library Manchester University 5x15 and the Barbican.

He previously ran a curiosity shop Viktor Wynd's Little Shop of Horrors, dealing in taxidermy, shrunken heads and other oddities including the erect mummified penis of a hanged man in 2010 it was reported that Jonathan Ross's wife Jane Goldman had bought the skeleton of a two headed baby from the shop.

and curated some 50 exhibitions at his gallery Viktor Wynd Fine Art including exhibitions on Mervyn Peake Tessa Farmer Leonora Carrington  & Stephen Tennant

References

English performance artists
Living people
Pataphysicians
Year of birth missing (living people)